Italy produces many food products.

Olive oil

Italy is the second largest producer in Europe and in the world of olive oil production with a national average of more than 464,000 tons, of which two thirds extra virgin and less than 41 PDO and PGI recognized by the EU.
In Italy, the olive tree is spread over approximately one million hectares in the primary culture and on a surface slightly less cultured, subsidiary with crops or with other tree species (vines, citrus, almond, etc.) .
Regarding the altitude areas, the olive has spread to 2% in the mountains, 53% hills and 44% plains. To the characteristics of the plant, which requires a mild climate, the cultivation of olive trees in Italy is widespread in the central regions (19%) and South ( 77.9%), while in the north the production is more limited ( 2%), but increasing, particularly focusing in some areas more temperate microclimate, such as Liguria and the hills around Lake Garda. The plants are producing about 170 million farms that deal olives are more than a million, so the average areas under cultivation are of the order of about one hectare, reflecting the extreme land fragmentation .

Honey
Strawberry-tree, thorn, ivy; rare as Barena honey, fruit of the Venetian lagoon and the small flowers that appear when the tide retreats, or more widespread such as sunflower. Italy boasts an unbeatable record: 51 varieties, all surveyed by the Ministry of Agriculture, compared with only 10 to 15 other countries. Produced throughout the boot, including the islands, but especially in the northern and central regions, particularly Emilia Romagna, Lombardy, Veneto and Piedmont. Less than in the south, despite the enviable climate. Blame the smaller presence of beekeepers.

Mastic
Mastic in Italy it is diffused in Liguria, on the peninsula and in the islands. On the western Adriatic coast does not go beyond Ancona. In the eastern dates back much further north reaching the entire coast of Istria.

Cheeses

 Asiago
 Gorgonzola
 Grana Padano
 Buffalo mozzarella
 Parmigiano-Reggiano
 Pecorino Romano
 Pecorino d'Abruzzo
 Caciocavallo
 Mozzarella
 Scamorza
 Stracchino

Cured meat

 Capocollo
 Cotechino
 Guanciale
 Mortadella
 Pancetta
 Prosciutto
 Prosciutto di Parma
 Prosciutto San Daniele
 Ventricina
 Liver sausage
 Wild pig's sausage

Wine

Italy is the world's largest wine producer.

 Prosecco
 Asti spumante
 Lambrusco
 Montepulciano d'Abruzzo
 Chianti
 Verdicchio
 Passerina

Bread, Pizza and Focaccia

 Piadina
 Pizza
 Breadstick
 Bruschetta
 Polenta

Pasta

 Spaghetti
 Agnolotti
 Tortellini
 Orecchiette
 Ravioli
 Tagliatelle
 Macaroni
 Lasagne
 Gnocchi
 Bucatini
 Penne

Rice

 Risotto

Eggs

 Frittata

Meat

 Bresaola
 Beefsteak Florentine style

Fish

 Tuna
 Cacciucco
 Mantis shrimp

See also

 Economy of Italy
 Cuisine of Italy
 Culture of Italy

References

Italian cuisine
Food products